Rockland Industries, Inc. is a textile manufacturing company.  The company is headquartered in Baltimore, Maryland and has manufacturing facilities in Bamberg, South Carolina.  Rockland Industries has sales in more than 90 countries worldwide, including the United States.

History
Rockland Industries was founded as Rockland Bleach and Dye Works in 1831 by three brothers from England - James, Robert, and John Wright. The company was formed in the Rockland Historic District of Brooklandville, an area of present-day Baltimore, and is recorded as the oldest corporation in Baltimore County. Rockland Bleach and Dye Works produced premier cotton and Irish woolens that were used all over the United States.

The current location of the headquarters and Baltimore manufacturing on Edison Highway was once Bugle Field, which was primarily used as a Negro league baseball field that was home to the Baltimore Elite Giants and Baltimore Black Sox from the late 1920s until around 1950. It was home to great players such as Roy Campanella, and was also the site that several Major League Baseball players were discovered, as Bugle Field was owned by the owners of the former Washington Senators and a local laundering company.

In 1944, Alexander Leaderman, a decorated U.S. Army officer, purchased the company after returning home from WWII and renamed it Rockland Industries.  The new company introduced the concept of lining curtains with a specially treated fabric to prevent them from being damaged by sunlight and moisture, much the way linings protect clothing fabric.  In 1963, Rockland patented and introduced Roc-lon Rain-No-Stain, the first brand name curtain lining ever produced.  The product featured insulation properties, oil and water-borne stain repellency, as well as a UV inhibitor for protection against fading.  Roc-lon Rain-No-Stain was awarded the Good Housekeeping Seal of Approval in 1964, the only drapery lining ever awarded that recognition.

Today, Rockland sells its Roc-lon Blackout blackout fabrics (which it claims it invented in the 1966) and drapery linings to the commercial hotel and hospitality trade as well as to the retail and residential markets. In addition to its commercial usage, Rockland’s blackout is also used by the U.S. State Department in embassies and consulates around the world, as well as U.S. government and military installations and service academies.

Rockland is the world’s largest manufacturer of drapery lining, with its success based largely on its long-running Roc-lon Rain-No-Stain and Roc-lon Blackout.

Awards
Good Housekeeping Seal of Approval –- 1964

U.S. Department of Commerce 'E' Award for Export Excellence—1992

U.S. Department of Commerce 'E Star' Award for Export Excellence –- 1995

References

Textile companies of the United States